A WeeMee is an avatar that can be exported to Facebook, Twitter and e-mail. WeeMees appear primarily on WeeWorld.com where users create homepages that are similar to Facebook which showcases their friends, messages received, and rooms. WeeMees can be used to chat in a virtual world, play in games and participate in forums. Users customize their WeeMees with trendy clothing, accessories and interests to make their WeeMee unique.

By June 2005 nearly 5 million users had created a personal WeeMee,  In October 2006 Iain Bruce of the Sunday Herald reported a new WeeMee being created every 5 seconds, and by April 2008 more than 21 million had been created with more than 600,000 new ones created each month. As of 2012, there were currently 50 million WeeMees and thousands were being created each day through the main website and the new mobile app "WeeMee Avatar Creator".

Background
The avatars were created in 1999 by the then CEO and Founder of Saw-You.com, Mike Kinsella, in Glasgow, Scotland, Saw-You.com was founded in 1999.  In 2003 Microsoft began offering the avatars for use to Hotmail customers.  The new service attracted 150,000 users during its first day, totaling 1.5 million hits daily. In 2004 the UK's largest social network, Friendsreunited.com, introduced the WeeMee to their user base. In December 2008 the virtual technology firm DA agreed to develop a 3-D version of the avatar.

Celebrity WeeMees
Along with using their own custom WeeMee on Weeworld.com, users can interact with celebrities who have official WeeMees. In addition to official Celebrity WeeMees, which are WeeMees created in association with a particular celebrity, there are "Fan Club" Celebrity WeeMees. "Fan Club" Celebrity WeeMees are run through WeeWorld without association with a celebrity and allow users to interact with others who are fans of particular celebrity figures. Popular celebrity WeeMees include Justin Bieber, Cody Simpson, Jason Derulo, Greyson Chance, Willow Smith, Maroon 5, Alicia Keys, Justin Timberlake, Paris Hilton and the Jonas Brothers. Many celebrities have their own clothing lines on WeeWorld as well. Users can dress their WeeMees in their favorite celebrity's clothing line.

Avatars
WeeWorld users can create and customize a WeeWorld virtual space and use a customized personal WeeMee avatar to connect with friends, send animated messages, play games and more. WeeMee characters can be customized with clothing and accessories.  The product is targeted towards a teenage market. Webuser magazine's review of WeeWorld stated, "Probably the most recognisable of all avatars, WeeMees have great charm."

See also
Avatar (computing)
Mii
Avatar (Xbox)
PlayStation Home#Avatar
Picrew

References

External links
WeeWorld official website

Virtual avatars